"Casi un Bolero" is the seventh overall single from Ricky Martin's fourth Spanish-language album, Vuelve (1998). It was released as a promotional single in Spain on December 21, 1998.

Background and release
"Casi un Bolero" was written by Draco Rosa, K. C. Porter and Luis Gómez Escolar, and produced by Porter and Rosa. It was included on Martin's 1998 album, Vuelve. The US and Japanese editions of the album also feature an instrumental version of the song. "Casi un Bolero" was released as the fourth single from Vuelve in Spain and seventh overall. It was released as a promotional single only on December 21, 1998, after "The Cup of Life," "La Bomba" and "Perdido Sin Ti."

Critical reception
Jose F. Promis from AllMusic mentioned "Casi un Bolero" as one of the highlights on Vuelve and called it a Sting-esque song.

Chart performance
The song entered the Top 40 Radio chart in Spain on January 2, 1999 and reached number seven there. It became the third most successful song from Vuelve on the Spanish radio, after chart-topping "The Cup of Life" and "La Bomba." Other singles in Spain, "Perdido Sin Ti" and "Por Arriba, Por Abajo" reached numbers eighteen and seventeen, respectively.

English-language version
Martin recorded also an English-language version of the song, titled "Almost a Love Song." The English lyrics were written by Desmond Child, who also co-produced this version. "Almost a Love Song" was included as B-side on Martin's future English-language singles: "Shake Your Bon-Bon" (1999), "Private Emotion" (2000) and "She Bangs" (2000). The Asian tour limited edition of Vuelve from late 1998 also includes a Spanglish version of "Casi un Bolero."

Music video
The promotional music video was released with the Spanglish version of the song. It includes live footage of Martin performing "Casi un Bolero."

Formats and track listings
Spanish promotional CD single
"Casi un Bolero" – 4:39

Charts

References

Ricky Martin songs
1998 singles
Spanish-language songs
Songs written by K. C. Porter
Songs written by Draco Rosa
Songs written by Luis Gómez Escolar
Pop ballads
1998 songs